Thomas Ayasse (born 17 February 1987) is a French professional footballer who plays as a midfielder for FCM Troyes. He is also the president of the club.

Career
On 1 June 2012, Ayasse signed a three-year deal with Nancy of the French Ligue 1.

On 25 June 2014, Ayasse moved to the Ligue 2 side Troyes on a three-year deal.

In January 2016, Ayasse quit struggling Troyes and signed for Le Havre.

In June 2020, after a year without club, Ayasse signed with French amateur team FCM Troyes. A year after his arrival, in June 2021, Ayasse was named president of the club. However, he would still continue as an active player.

References

External links
 
 
 

1987 births
Living people
Association football midfielders
French footballers
Toulouse FC players
Stade de Reims players
AS Cannes players
AC Arlésien players
AS Nancy Lorraine players
ES Troyes AC players
Le Havre AC players
Stade Brestois 29 players
Ligue 1 players
Ligue 2 players